Raili Halttu (13 July 1909 – 3 December 2006) was a Finnish sprinter. She competed in the women's 100 metres at the 1936 Summer Olympics.

References

External links
 

1909 births
2006 deaths
Athletes (track and field) at the 1936 Summer Olympics
Finnish female sprinters
Olympic athletes of Finland
Place of birth missing
Olympic female sprinters